Arnold Roth (born April 28, 1953) is an American conductor, composer, and record producer.  His work includes conducting concerts for video game music. He is also a classically trained violinist and a member of the Grammy Award-winning music group Mannheim Steamroller. Roth is also the principal conductor and music director of the Chicagoland Pops Orchestra, Play! A Video Game Symphony, and several Final Fantasy concerts. He won the Best Score Award at the 2003 DVD Premier Awards for his soundtrack to the film Barbie as Rapunzel and was nominated for an Emmy Award in 2007 for his original song "Shine"  from Barbie in the 12 Dancing Princesses. Roth graduated from Bienen School of Music, an undergraduate and graduate institution of Northwestern University in 1975. He has a son and a daughter who are both also involved in music; his son, Eric Roth (born 1977), is also a famed conductor.

Composer credits
Barbie in the Nutcracker (2001)
Barbie as Rapunzel (2002)
Barbie of Swan Lake (2003)
Barbie as the Princess and the Pauper (2004)
Barbie and the Magic of Pegasus (2005)
Barbie in the 12 Dancing Princesses (2006)
Barbie as the Island Princess (2007)
Barbie & the Diamond Castle (2008)

References

External links
Official website

1953 births
20th-century American composers
20th-century American conductors (music)
20th-century classical composers
21st-century American composers
21st-century American conductors (music)
21st-century classical composers
American classical composers
American conductors (music)
American film score composers
American male classical composers
American male conductors (music)
American record producers
Bienen School of Music alumni
Living people
American male film score composers
Mannheim Steamroller members
20th-century American male musicians
21st-century American male musicians